Derby Day is a 1923 short silent comedy film directed by Robert F. McGowan. It was the 19th Our Gang short subject released.

Plot
As the gang are selling lemonade across the street from the racetrack, they meet up with Mary, whose rich father owns one of the horses. She gets them into the track, and they are sufficiently impressed to start up their own junior version.

Critical reception
Upon its original 1923 release, Derby Day was well received by critics. Motion Picture News reviewer Roger Ferri commented, "Hal Roach's company of clever juvenile comedians makes Zev, Morich, and Man o' War look like 'also rans' in Derby Day, about the funniest thing this mob has done for cinematographic entertainment. With the air topped with turf gossip this travesty on horse racing comes at an opportune time. . . . For originality, Derby Day can't be beat—you can't touch it. It's in a class by itself. . . . [A] description of the theme does the comedy no justice—it's got to be seen, and once your audience see it they won't forget it."

Production notes
When the television rights for the original silent Pathé Our Gang comedies were sold to National Telepix and other distributors, several episodes were retitled. This film was released into television syndication as "Mischief Makers" in 1960 under the title Little Jockeys. Two-thirds of the original film was included. Derby Day was the last Our Gangcomedy for Jack Davis.

The Film Detective streaming site has a different title card, which is indicating the title of the film as Derby Days.

Cast

The Gang
 Joe Cobb — Joe
 Jackie Condon — Jackie
 Mickey Daniels — Mickey
 Jack Davis — Jack
 Allen Hoskins — Farina
 Mary Kornman — Mary
 Ernest Morrison — Sunshine Sammy
 Sonny Loy — Sing Joy
 Dinah the Mule — Herself

Additional cast
 Charles A. Bachman — police officer
 Richard Daniels — trainer
 William Gillespie — Mary's father
 Wallace Howe — gate attendant

References

External links

1923 films
American silent short films
American black-and-white films
1923 comedy films
Films directed by Robert F. McGowan
Hal Roach Studios short films
Our Gang films
Films with screenplays by H. M. Walker
1923 short films
1920s American films
Silent American comedy films
1920s English-language films